Mehmet Bey's firman was the decree of Mehmet I of Karaman (Karamanoğlu Mehmet), a vizier of Suljuks, declaring that the official language of Seljuks was Turkish.
Mehmet Beg or Mehmet Bey of Karaman, also known as Shams al-Din Mehmed Beg was the third ruler of the Karamanids. His father was Karaman Bey.

Mehmet Fuat Köprülü suggested that the government officials, who had been educated under the influence of the Persian culture, had used the Persian language in their state's official business, and this strong compulsion of using Persian as official language had lasted until the Karamanids lord Mehmed Bey's invasion of Konya.

Agop Dilaçar, who is known for his works on the Sun Language Theory, claimed that Mehmed Bey might have declared Turkish the official language of the state. According to Dilaçar, in his firman dated 13 May (15 May ?) 1277, he ordered that "from that day forward, in the council, in the dervish lodge, in the court, in the assembly, in the square, no language but Turkish should be spoken".

After his failed rebellion in Ankara, Mehmet Bey died in a conflict against Seljuq-Mongol troops.

See also 
Old Anatolian Turkish language
Jimri

References

External links
"723. Yıkdönümü Dolayısıyla Karamanoğlu Mehmet Bey'den Önce ve Sonra Devlet Dili Türkçe", Balıkesir University 

Karamanids
Turkic rulers
1277 deaths
Year of birth unknown
Turkish language